Erekle (1568 – 1589) was a Georgian prince (batonishvili) of the royal house of Kakheti, son of King Alexander II of Kakheti by his wife Tinatin Amilakhvari.

According to the 18th-century Georgian historian Prince Vakhushti, Erekle, soon after Alexader's accession to the throne of Kakheti, took offence at his brother Davit and clandestinely repaired for the Ottoman court in Constantinople. The Safavid Iranian shah Tahmasp I saw this as a renege on the Kakhetians' pledge of loyalty. Advancing with his army into Karabakh, the shah summoned Alexander to his camp. Through the machinations of Prince Cholokashvili, the Kakhetians managed to divert the shah's attention to the political intrigues in the principality of Samtskhe, which was invaded and ravaged by the Iranians in 1574.

In 1578, when Lala Kara Mustafa Pasha's Ottoman army marched into Georgia, Alexander II of Kakheti accepted the sultan's suzerainty and helped Lala Pasha to conquer Shirvan. Alexander's son Erekle was briefly appointed by the Ottomans a governor of sanjak of Shaki in Shirvan, which had hitherto been ruled by Alexander's alienated brother Isa-Khan on the shah of Iran's behalf. Erekle reappears in the historical records as a signatory, together with his father Alexander II and brothers, Davit and Giorgi, to the oath of allegiance to Feodor I of Russia on 28 September 1587, a culmination of the mission of the Russian envoy Rodion Birkin, which, however, did not bring about any tangible changes in the regional political climate.

Ancestry

References 

1568 births
1589 deaths
Bagrationi dynasty of the Kingdom of Kakheti
People from Kakheti
16th-century people from Georgia (country)
Georgian princes